Estar Avia, formerly Unitemp-M Industrial (which was also known as MPK Rossiya) is a passenger charter airline based in Russia under the ownership of ESTAR Holding.

The parent company approached bankruptcy in 2009 and has since restructured its debts and gained a new investor.

Fleet

References

Defunct airlines of Russia
Airlines established in 2003
Companies based in Moscow